María Cristina Laurenz (born 1940) is a retired Argentine actress and singer active between 1960 and 1994. She is the daughter of Tango musician Pedro Laurenz.

She starred in Adiós Roberto in 1985 retiring in 1994.

Filmography
Día que me quieras, El (1994) TV Series .... Rosario
Elegida, La (1992) TV Series .... Gloria
Adiós, Roberto (1985)
Minguito Tinguitela, papá (1974)
Picnic de los Campanelli, El (1972)
Veraneo de los Campanelli, El (1971)
"Campanelli, Los" (1969) TV Series
Encuentro, El (1966/II)
Máscaras en otoño (1966)
Lugar al sol, Un (1965)
Pajarito Gómez (1964) .... The Girl
Los de la mesa 10 (1960)
La patota (1960) .... Mujer en fiesta de graduación

External links
 

1940 births
Living people
Argentine film actresses